Kinegram may refer to:
A type of diffractive optically variable image device used to prevent counterfeiting
A type of barrier-grid animation